John Stoneham may refer to:
 John Stoneham (baseball)
 John Stoneham (footballer)